Kuantania is a genus of grasshoppers in the family Pyrgomorphidae, subfamily Orthacridinae and tribe Orthacridini.

Species
The Orthoptera Species File lists the following species:
Kuantania aptera Kevan, 1963 - Vietnam
Kuantania squamipennis Miller, 1935 - type species - Peninsular Malaysia

References

Pyrgomorphidae
Caelifera genera
Invertebrates of Southeast Asia